Douglas J. Dressler (born August 19, 1948) is a former professional American football player who played running back for five seasons for the Cincinnati Bengals, the Kansas City Chiefs, and the New England Patriots.Doug also played rugby for the Glenn County Warriors.

Early life
Doug Dressler was born in Beaver Falls, Pennsylvania, the first of three children of Richard Gale Dressler and Patricia Jennings Dressler. Richard, a U.S. Navy veteran, was employed by National Cash Register, Booz Allen Hamilton, Lockheed, and Addressograph Multigraph, and later owned a printing business.

Dressler's family moved from Pennsylvania to North Hollywood, California when he was an infant. His sophomore year in high school, Dressler transferred to Las Vegas High School, from which he graduated.

After high school, he attended the College of Marin in Kentfield, California. He then enrolled in Chico State University, where he played tight end and defensive end and was also fourth in the nation as a heavyweight wrestler.

Professional career
Dressler in 1970 signed as an undrafted free agent with the Cincinnati Bengals, and was part of the 1970 team that won the Bengals' first-ever title, the AFC Central Division championship. He played for the Bengals from 1970 to 1974.  

His best year was 1972, when he rushed for 565 yards, averaging 4.4 yards per carry and scoring six of his nine career rushing touchdowns. Dressler and Essex Johnson became the first Bengals running back duo to rush for more than 100 yards each in one game against the Houston Oilers on Oct. 29, as Dressler had 110 yards and Johnson 103. He also scored three touchdowns in one game, again against the Oilers, and in a game against the Pittsburgh Steelers he had a career-high nine receptions.

In 1975, he played with the New England Patriots and the Kansas City Chiefs.

Personal life
After retiring from the NFL, Dressler was always active in youth sports as a coach, baseball umpire and wrestling official. He also played rugby with the Hastings Law School Rugby Football Club. 

He and his wife, Jody (whom Doug met while at Chico State) were Menlo Park, California and Atherton, California residents for 31 years. After 25 years, Doug Dressler resigned his teaching post at Kennedy Middle School in Redwood City, California in 2009 and Jody retired from her position as a special education teacher for the San Mateo County Office of Education after 35 years. They now reside in Lake Almanor, California. They have two grown children, son Bodey and daughter Shayla.

References

1948 births
Living people
American football running backs
Chico State Wildcats football players
Cincinnati Bengals players
Kansas City Chiefs players
Marin Mariners football players
New England Patriots players
People from Atherton, California
People from Beaver Falls, Pennsylvania
People from Menlo Park, California
Players of American football from Pennsylvania
Sportspeople from the Pittsburgh metropolitan area